This is a list of notable pancake houses. A pancake house is a restaurant that specializes in breakfast items such as pancakes, waffles, and omelettes, among other items.  Many small, independent pancake houses, as well as large corporations and franchises, use the terminology in their establishment names. They are most commonly found in Canada and the United States.

Pancake houses

International chains are listed in the country in which they were founded.

Australia 
 Pancake Parlour

Canada 
 Cora
 Ricky's All Day Grill
 Smitty's

Mexico 
 The Pancake House, Puerto Vallarta

United States 

 Bickford's
 Black Bear Diner
 Bob Evans Restaurants
 Cracker Barrel
 Denny's
 Du-par's
 Eat'n Park
 Golden Nugget Pancake House
 Hash House a go go
 Honey Jam Cafe
 Huddle House
 IHOP
 The Original Pancake House
 Pamela's Diner
 Perkins Restaurant and Bakery
 The Royal Canadian Pancake Houses
 Toddle House
 Village Inn
 VIP's
 Walker Bros.
 Waffle House

See also

 List of breakfast drinks
 List of breakfast foods
 List of breakfast topics
 Lists of restaurants

References

 
Lists of restaurants